Henry Cary Jr. was an American planter and building contractor, active during the early 1700s.

Biography
Cary was born in Colonial Virginia around the mid to late 1600s to Henry Cary Sr. and Judith Lockey Cary. There are few surviving records of his early life but it is likely that he learned about contracting through his father, who also worked as a contractor. Cary married three times and had seven children, three with his first wife Sarah Sclater and four with his second wife, Ann Edwards.

Construction
Cary became visibly active in construction after his father's retirement in 1710 and in December 1720 he was authorized to work on the Governor's Palace, in Williamsburg, Virginia, a project that his father had begun but was unable to complete. This was one of several jobs that Cary performed at Williamsburg and in 1726 he was hired to construct new gates for the Capitol.

He went on to oversee the construction of St. John's Episcopal Church in Hampton (1728), and several buildings at the College of William & Mary:  a chapel wing (1729) and the President's House (1732).  Cary was also likely in charge of constructing the Brafferton building (1723).

Around 1733, Cary moved to a large plantation on the south bank of the James River, just downstream from present day Richmond in Chesterfield County, Virginia, where he built Ampthill, which served as the Cary family home for many generations.

See also

 List of people from Virginia

References

Year of birth unknown
Place of birth unknown
Year of death unknown
Place of death unknown
17th-century births
18th-century deaths
17th-century American businesspeople
18th-century American businesspeople
American builders
People from Chesterfield County, Virginia
People from Williamsburg, Virginia
Henry Jr.
American slave owners